The Andrew P. McArdle Memorial Bridge is a steel truss bascule bridge over the Chelsea Creek, just upstream of its confluence with the Mystic River and the Tobin Bridge. Also known as the Meridian Street Bridge, it connects Meridian Street in East Boston with Pearl Street in Chelsea, Massachusetts. The bridge is a split rolling bascule, meaning that instead of pivoting on axles, the two counterweighted spans are raised by rolling on large semi-circular gears.

The bridge was refurbished in 2002. According to the U.S. Federal Highway Administration 2017 National Bridge Inventory, the bridge structure's condition is poor and is  "[b]asically intolerable requiring high priority of replacement."

References

McArdle
Chelsea, Massachusetts
Bridges in Suffolk County, Massachusetts
Bascule bridges in the United States